The Don River is a perennial river for most of its length, located in the north-western region of Tasmania, Australia.

Location and features
The river rises in West Kentish near Sheffield and flows generally north into Bass Strait at Devonport. The river descends  over its  course.

See also

References

Rivers of Tasmania
North West Tasmania